Sir Gilbert Ireland (1624 – 30 April 1675) of Hale Hall, Lancashire was an English politician who sat in the House of Commons  at various times between 1654 and 1675.

Ireland was the son of John Ireland of Hutt and Hale and his wife Elizabeth Hays, daughter of Sir Thomas Hays, alderman of London. He was a  grandson of Sir Gilbert Ireland who brought the giant John Middleton to court. He inherited both the house at Hutt and Hale Hall on the death of his father in 1633. In 1645, he was one of committee appointed by parliament to assess taxes in Lancashire. He was High Sheriff of Lancashire in 1648.

In 1654, Ireland was elected Member of Parliament for Lancashire in the First Protectorate Parliament, and was re-elected in 1656 for the Second Protectorate Parliament. In 1659, he was elected MP for Liverpool in the Third Protectorate Parliament. Ireland was re-elected MP for Liverpool in April 1660 for the Convention Parliament. He was knighted at the Restoration on 16 June 1660. In 1661 he was re-elected MP for Liverpool for the Cavalier Parliament and sat until his death in 1675.

In 1674 he moved into Hale Hall after completing alterations to the house. He hid the gables on the north front of the Jacobean  building behind a brick parapet which was ornamented with stone medallions and other features and arched over the recesses between the bays. On the  tower he placed a stone tablet inscribed "Built by Sir Gilbert Ireland, Knt, and Dame Margt, Ao dI 1674".

He was elected Mayor of Liverpool in 1674, but died during his year of office. Ireland had married Margaret Ireland, daughter of Thomas Ireland of Beausey, Lancashire, but died without issue. Hale Hall passed to his nephew, also Gilbert.

References

 

1624 births
1675 deaths
High Sheriffs of Lancashire
Mayors of Liverpool
Members of the Parliament of England (pre-1707) for Lancashire
English MPs 1654–1655
English MPs 1656–1658
English MPs 1659
English MPs 1660
English MPs 1661–1679
Members of the Parliament of England (pre-1707) for Liverpool
People from Childwall